Hirudinaria is the scientific name of two genera of organisms and may refer to:

Hirudinaria (annelid), a genus of leeches in the family Cylicobdellidae
Hirudinaria (fungus), a genus of fungi